The 2015 Costa Rican Cup (known as Torneo de Copa Banco Popular for sponsorship reasons) is the 3rd staging of the Costa Rican Cup. The competition began on July 4 and finished on November 19 with the final at the Estadio Nacional. The cup featured 20 teams, composed of all 12 teams of the FPD and 8 from the Liga de Ascenso. Originally, teams from the Liga Nacional de Fútbol Aficionado were expected to participate as well, but were withdrawn due to lack of budget.

The format of the tournament marked several differences to that of its predecessor, such as the lack of a group stage (similar to the 2013 edition), and the addition of a "best loser" rule, in which a team could still qualify to a further round, despite having lost a match.

The tournament saw the defending champions Cartaginés earning a second title by defeating Herediano in the final.

Qualified teams
The following teams were announced to participate in the 2015 Costa Rican Cup:

12 teams from the 2015–16 FPD:

Alajuelense
Belén
Carmelita
Cartaginés
Herediano
Municipal Liberia
Limón
Pérez Zeledón
Santos de Guápiles
Saprissa
Universidad de Costa Rica
Uruguay de Coronado

8 teams from the 2014–15 Liga de Ascenso:

AS Puma Generaleña
Aserrí
Barrio México
Cariari
Escazuceña
Guanacasteca
Osa
Turrialba

Bracket

First round
The draw for the first round was held on 26 June 2015.

Matches

Second round
The draw for the second round was held on 6 July 2015.

Matches

Third round

First leg

Second leg

Semi-finals

First leg

Second leg

Final

References

External links
 

Costa Rican Cup
2015–16 in Costa Rican football